This is a list of the main career statistics of Spanish professional tennis player, Fernando Verdasco.

Career milestones 
To date, Verdasco has won seven ATP singles titles, with his biggest title coming at the 2010 Barcelona Open Banco Sabadell. Other highlights of Verdasco's career include reaching the final of the 2010 Monte-Carlo Rolex Masters (defeating Novak Djokovic along the way); the semi-finals of the 2009 Australian Open (defeating then World No. 4 Andy Murray in the fourth round before losing to then World No. 1 and eventual champion Rafael Nadal in the longest match in Australian Open history at the time) and 2010 Internazionali BNL d'Italia and the quarterfinals of the US Open in 2009 and 2010 as well as Wimbledon in 2013.

Verdasco is also a successful doubles player, winning eight ATP doubles titles including one year-end championship at the 2013 ATP World Tour Finals with David Marrero, and reaching six grand slam doubles quarterfinals at the Australian Open, French Open and US Open between 2004 and 2014. He was also part of the Spanish teams which won the Davis Cup in 2008, 2009 and 2011 and the Hopman Cup in 2013. Verdasco achieved career high singles and doubles rankings of World No. 7 and World No. 8 on April 20, 2009 and November 11, 2013.

Significant finals

Year-end championships finals

Doubles: 1 (1 title)

ATP Masters 1000 finals

Singles: 1 (1 runner-up)

Doubles: 1 (1 runner-up)

ATP career finals

Singles: 23 (7 titles, 16 runner-ups)

Doubles: 13 (8 titles, 5 runner-ups)

Team competition finals: 4 (4 titles)

Davis Cup: 3 (3 titles)
Verdasco played with La Armada for seven straight years from 2005 to 2011, winning the trophy in 2008 and 2009, as well as in 2011.

Hopman Cup: 1 (1 title)

Exhibition tournament finals: 2 (2 titles)

Performance timelines

Singles
Current through the 2023 Qatar Open.

1Madrid was played in the fall on indoor hard courts until 2008. In 2009 it switched to outdoor clay in the spring.

Doubles

Wins over top 10 players
He has a  record against players who were, at the time the match was played, ranked in the top 10.

ATP Tour career earnings

* Statistics correct .

See also
Spain Davis Cup team
List of Spain Davis Cup team representatives
Tennis in Spain
Sport in Spain

References

External links

 
 Fernando Verdasco at the ITF profile
 

Tennis career statistics